The 1995 Adelaide International was a men's tennis tournament held in Adelaide, Australia and played on outdoor hard courts. The event was  part of the ATP World Series of the 1995 ATP Tour. It was the 18th edition of the tournament and was held from 2 January through 9 January 1995.

Jim Courier won his 1st title of the year, and 15th of his career.

Finals

Singles

 Jim Courier defeated  Arnaud Boetsch, 6–2, 7–5

Doubles

 Jim Courier /  Patrick Rafter defeated  Byron Black /  Grant Connell, 7–6, 6–4

References

External links
ITF – Tournament details

Australian Mens Hardcourt Championships, 1995
Hard
Next Generation Adelaide International
1990s in Adelaide
January 1995 sports events in Australia